Rubashevka is a rural locality (a settlement) and the administrative center of Rubashevskoye Rural Settlement, Anninsky District, Voronezh Oblast, Russia. The population was 451 as of 2010. There are 7 streets.

Geography 
Rubashevka is located 29 km northeast of Anna (the district's administrative centre) by road. Posyolok otdeleniya 2-ya Pyatiletka sovkhoza Krasnoye Znamya is the nearest rural locality.

References 

Rural localities in Anninsky District